Hudson High School is a public secondary school serving grades 9 through 12 in Hudson, St. Croix County, Wisconsin, United States. Hudson High School is located on the St. Croix River on the border of Wisconsin and Minnesota. For the 2015-16 school year, the enrollment was 1,749.

History 
A 2014 referendum requesting $100 million for a new building failed.

Curriculum
The Hudson High School offers both common core classes (English, social studies, science, math, music, and physical education) and electives (business, agriculture, computer science, art, family consumer). Many AP classes are also offered.

In 2014, Hudson High School began STEM+ and healthcare academy programs.

Extracurricular activities

Athletics 
Hudson High School offers football, baseball, softball, track, golf, tennis, soccer, basketball, gymnastics, swimming and diving, hockey, wrestling, floor hockey, volleyball, cheerleading, danceline, "trap" clay target shooting, marching band, and cross country. Students may also participate in intramural sports.

Organizations 
Student organizations include:

 Athletes Making Progress or H Club
 Anime/Asian Culture Club
 Author's Anonymous
 Bands
 DECA
 Destination Imagination
 Diversity Club
 Dungeons and Dragons Club
 Civil Discourse (Defunct)
 Drama Club - One Act Play
 FCCLA
 Future Farmers of America
 Forensics
 German Club 
 Gender and Sexuality Alliance
 Health Occupation Students of America
 Hudson Trap Shooting Club
 Magik Club 
 Make A Change - MAC
 Minecraft Club
 Musicals, Plays & Hudson High Harmony
 National Art Honor Society
 National Honor Society Sr. & Jr.
 Orchestra Music
 Outdoor Club
 Peer Helpers
 Prom Committee
 Quiz Bowl
 SADD - Students Against Destructive Decisions
 Space Club 
 Spanish Club
 STS - Student to Student Mentors
 Student Council
 Trickery Club
 Young Republicans Club

Notable alumni
 Jim Bertelsen - professional football player
 Davis Drewiske - professional hockey player
 Arthur D. Kelly - Wisconsin State Representative
 Kraig Urbik - professional football player
 Dale Weiler- professional soccer player
John Huot- Minnesota State  legislator

References

External links
 Official website
 Sport Schedule

Public high schools in Wisconsin
Schools in St. Croix County, Wisconsin